Gerasim Zelić (1752–1828) was a Serbian Orthodox Church archimandrite, traveller and writer. His chief work is Žitije (Lives), in three volumes. They are memoirs of his travels throughout western Europe, Russia and Asia Minor from the latter half of the 18th century to the first decade of the 19th century and the famous personalities (Napoleon, Eugène de Beauharnais, Viceroy of Italy, Joseph II, Holy Roman Emperor, Leopold II, Holy Roman Emperor, Francis II, Holy Roman Emperor, Semyon Zorich, Catherine the Great, Alexander I of Russia, Stanisław August Poniatowski, Dositej Obradović) he encountered. He left behind invaluable original notes on the people, religions, manners, customs, and trade of his era.

As much as Dositej Obradović is an emblematic figure of the 18th century Habsburg Serbian Enlightenment so is Gerasim Zelić. In many ways the East-West travel itineraries of the two men are similar, covering the Levant, the German lands, France and Russia, though Zelić went first to Russia (rather than to the Levant). While both lament their people's plight under the Ottoman rule and promote similar solutions, their perspectives are different, Dositej's cosmopolitanism contrasting with Zelić's clericalism, though their intentions are the same: the emancipation of their people from under the tyrannical yoke of the two empires, the Habsburg and the Ottoman.

Zelić was one of the earliest members of the Serbian Learned Society, better known as Matica srpska, founded at Budapest in 1826.

References

Sources
.

1752 births
1838 deaths
Serbs of Croatia
People of the Serbian Revolution
18th-century Eastern Orthodox clergy
19th-century Eastern Orthodox clergy
18th-century Serbian people
19th-century Serbian people
Serbian writers
Serbian diplomats
Serbian Orthodox clergy
Serb priests
Habsburg Serbs
Burials at Serbian Orthodox monasteries and churches